RDCM may refer to:
 The stock ticker for Radcom Ltd
 Abbreviation for × Rodricidium